Chouaib Doukkali University is a public university in El Jadida, Morocco, founded by a royal decree (Dahir) in 1985. The university is named after the Moroccan scholar, theologian, and politician Abou Chouaib Doukkali (1878–1937).

Organization 
The university consists of five different schools or faculties:

 Faculty of Letters and Human Sciences (Humanities)
 Faculty of Sciences
 Faculty of Juridical, Economic and Social Sciences (former name: Faculty of Multi-Disciplinary Studies) (2004)
 National School of Business and Management (2006)
 National School of Applied Sciences (2008)

Notable alumni
Jaafar Aksikas (Class of 1997), Moroccan-American academic and cultural critic.

See also
 List of universities in Morocco

References

External links
 Chouaib Doukkali University website

Buildings and structures in Casablanca-Settat
Universities in Morocco
Educational institutions established in 1985
1985 establishments in Morocco
20th-century architecture in Morocco